Sweetwater is an extinct town in Lyon County, in the U.S. state of Nevada.

History
A post office was established at Sweetwater in 1870, and remained in operation until 1925. The community took its name from the Sweetwater Mountains.

References

Ghost towns in Lyon County, Nevada